Bryan Bayley (17 April 1933 – 19 June 2012) was a New Zealand cricketer. He played in twelve first-class matches for Canterbury and Northern Districts between 1957 and 1965.

References

External links
 

1933 births
2012 deaths
New Zealand cricketers
Canterbury cricketers
Northern Districts cricketers
Cricketers from Greymouth